Tenderfoot Tactics is an indie tactical role-playing game. The player controls a group of goblins to free an archipelago from a corrupting fog.

Gameplay

Reception 
Tenderfoot Tactics has received praise for its minimalist aesthetic and distinctive map mechanics. Antal Bokor of the Third Coast Review described it positively as "a sometimes strange, often bleak game set in an acid tripping world" with "remarkable" art. Ewan Wilson of NME rated the game 4 out of 5 stars, calling it "beautiful-looking" and additionally lauding the soundtrack that "recall[s] the main theme from the cult horror film Suspiria". Fraser Brown of PC Gamer appreciated the mysterious feel of the game, calling it "singular and weird and well worth a trip".

References 

2020 video games
Indie video games
macOS games
Single-player video games
Tactical role-playing video games
Windows games
Ice Water Games games